Lingshan Temple is a Buddhist temple located in Chaoyang District, Shantou, Guangdong, China.

History

Tang dynasty
This temple was built by a prominent Chan master  in 791, in the 7th year of Zhenyuan period of the Tang dynasty (618–907). After studying Buddhism from Shitou Xiqian, Chaozhou Dadian came to Chaozhou, where he founded the original temple. In 819, Han Yu, the renowned poet and writer, was publicly disgraced and sent into exile. Han Yu became a friend of Chaozhou Dadian and he often came to talk with him. In 822, Emperor Muzong inscribed and honored the name "Lingshan Huguo Chan Temple".

Song dynasty
In 1012, in the reign of Emperor Zhenzong in the Song dynasty (960–1279), monk Jueran restored and redecorated the temple. It was renamed "Lingshan Kaishan Chan Temple" in 1029, during the reign of Emperor Renzong.

Ming dynasty
In 1369, at the dawn of the Ming dynasty (1368–1644), monk Kongshan refurbished the temple. Lingshan Temple was devastated in 1521 with only one hall and the Shanmen remaining. 

In 1633, in the reign of Chongzhen Emperor, magistrate Yang Zhuo supervised the reconstruction of Lingshan Temple.

Qing dynasty
In 1701, in the Kangxi era of the Qing dynasty (1644–1911), magistrate Peng Xiangsheng appropriated a large sum of money for constructing the temple. Under the leadership of Xinru, the reconstruction was completed in 1706.

People's Republic of China
After the establishment of the Communist State in 1949, Lingshan Temple has been dilapidated for neglect. 

During the ten-year Cultural Revolution, the red guards damaged the temple and incurred massive losses of the valuable cultural relics.

After the 3rd Plenary Session of the 11th Central Committee of the Chinese Communist Party, according to the national policy of free religious belief, monks returned to Lingshan Temple, regular scripture lectures, meditation and other features of temple spiritual practices were resumed.  

Lingshan Temple has been inscribed as National Key Buddhist Temple in Han Chinese Area by the State Council of China in 1983.

Architecture

Thousand Buddha Pagoda
It is made of granite. Over 1,000 exquisite niches with small statues of Buddha are carved on the body of the pagoda.

References

Buddhist temples in Shantou
Buildings and structures in Shantou
Tourist attractions in Shantou
1706 establishments in China
18th-century Buddhist temples
Religious buildings and structures completed in 1706